Vernonia nonoensis is a species of flowering plant in the aster family that is endemic to Ecuador. Its natural habitat is subtropical or tropical moist montane forests.

References

nonoensis
Endemic flora of Ecuador
Endangered plants
Taxonomy articles created by Polbot